Nowgong Assembly constituency is one of the 126 Assembly constituencies of Assam Legislative Assembly. Currently Rupak Sarmah of Bharatiya Janata Party represents this constituency. The constituency is represented mostly by Indian National Congress legislators (9 times) followed by Asom Gana Parishad legislators (4 times). Girindra Kumar Baruah and Mukut Sharma represented the constituency three times each.

Nowgong constituency is also a part of Nowgong Lok Sabha Constituency.

Members of Legislative Assembly

Election results

2016 result

References

External links 
 

Assembly constituencies of Assam
Nagaon district